Frank Warner Capra (March 20, 1934 – December 19, 2007), known as Frank Capra Jr., was an American film and television producer. He was one of the three children of film director Frank Capra and his second wife, Lucille Warner. His own sons, Frank Capra III and Jonathan Capra, are assistant directors. 

At the time of his death, Capra Jr. was president of EUE/Screen Gems studio, which he had helped to found in Wilmington, North Carolina, in the mid-1980s, and a member of the North Carolina Film Council.

Death
Capra Jr. died on December 19, 2007, aged 73, at a hospital in Philadelphia, Pennsylvania, after a long battle with prostate cancer.

Filmography
Mark Twain's Greatest Adventure: 'It's a Matter of Time''' (2005) (pre-production) (producer)Queen City Blowout (2003) (executive producer)Waterproof (2000) (producer)Death Before Dishonor (1987) (executive producer)Marie (1985) (producer)Firestarter (1984) (producer)The Seduction (1982) (executive producer)Vice Squad (1982) (executive producer)High Hopes: The Capra Years (1981) (TV) (producer)An Eye for an Eye (1981) (producer)The Black Marble (1980) (producer)Born Again (1978) (producer)Billy Jack Goes to Washington (1977) (producer)Trapped Beneath the Sea (1974) (TV) (producer)Battle for the Planet of the Apes (1973) (associate producer)Tom Sawyer (1973/I) (associate producer)Conquest of the Planet of the Apes (1972) (associate producer)Play It Again, Sam (1972) (associate producer)Escape from the Planet of the Apes (1971) (associate producer)Marooned (1969) (associate producer)

References
 Fox, Margalit. "Frank Capra Jr., Movie and TV Producer, Dies at 73", New York Times.'' December 22, 2007.

External links

1934 births
2007 deaths
Businesspeople from Los Angeles
American people of Italian descent
American film producers
Deaths from prostate cancer
Deaths from cancer in Pennsylvania
20th-century American businesspeople